Rainbow Sandals Inc. was established in 1974 in Laguna Beach, California by Jay Longley and is currently based in San Clemente, California. The company specializes in men's and women's leather, hemp, and rubber flip-flops.

When Longley first started making sandals, he was assembling 15 pairs per day out of leather and Malaysian rubber in the garage of his Laguna Beach home. He relocated to San Clemente in 1975 and began manufacturing 1,200 pairs of sandals a day. Since 2002, Longley had to move 75% of production to China because of a solvent in the glue he uses. Longley had to install a catalytic oxidizer at his San Clemente factory that scrubs all the volatile organic compounds out of the glue before they are emitted into the air. He is legally allowed to make only 1,000 pairs per day in San Clemente. In China, they use a glue that has no volatile organic compounds. Longley cannot use this glue in California because it is too combustible under the fire code.

References

External links 
Official website

 

Shoe companies of the United States
Manufacturing companies based in California
Companies based in San Clemente, California
Clothing companies established in 1974
1974 establishments in California